Reveille in Washington, 1860–1865 is a book by  Margaret Leech. It  won the 1942 Pulitzer Prize for History.

References 

Pulitzer Prize for History-winning works
History books about the American Civil War